Stenalia atricolor is a beetle in the genus Stenalia of the family Mordellidae. It was described in 1926.

References

atricolor
Beetles described in 1926